Shields are hand-held protective devices meant to intercept attacks.

Shields may also refer to:

Places

United Kingdom
 North Shields, Tyneside, England
 South Shields, Tyneside, England
 Shields Road subway station, an underground station in Glasgow, Scotland

United States
 Shields, Indiana, an unincorporated community
 Shields, Kansas, an unincorporated community
 Shields, Michigan, an unincorporated community in Saginaw County
 Shields, North Dakota, an unincorporated community near Bismarck
 Shields, Pennsylvania, an unincorporated community in Leetsdale, Allegheny County
 Shields, Dodge County, Wisconsin, a town
 Shields, Marquette County, Wisconsin, a town
 Shields River, a Yellowstone River tributary
 Shields Township, Holt County, Nebraska

People
 Shields (surname), list of notable people with the surname

Art, entertainment, and media
 Shields (album), 2012 album by Grizzly Bear
 Shields (Star Trek), a technology that protects starships, space stations, and planets from damage in the Star Trek universe

Other uses
 Shields (keelboat), a sailboat class
 Shields (card suit), one of the four suits in standard Swiss playing cards

See also
Shield (disambiguation)